Schmiebach (also: Schmie) is a river of Baden-Württemberg, Germany. It flows into the Enz in Vaihingen an der Enz.

See also
List of rivers of Baden-Württemberg

References

Rivers of Baden-Württemberg
Rivers of Germany